The Fake is a 1953 British crime film directed by Godfrey Grayson and starring Dennis O'Keefe, Coleen Gray and Hugh Williams. Its plot concerns an American detective who tries to solve the theft of a priceless painting from the Tate Gallery in London.

Plot
When Leonardo da Vinci's  Madonna and Child arrives at London's Tate Gallery for a special exhibition, American Paul Mitchell (Dennis O'Keefe) is assigned to guard it. However, on examination, Paul realizes that the painting has been replaced with a fake. Joining forces with Tate employee Mary Mason (Coleen Gray), Paul attempts to find the original and collect the museum's $50,000 reward for its recovery.

Cast
 Dennis O'Keefe - Paul Mitchell
 Coleen Gray - Mary Mason
 Hugh Williams - Sir Richard Aldingham
 Guy Middleton - Smith
 John Laurie - Henry Mason
 Eliot Makeham - Pavement Artist
 Gerald Case - Peter Randall
 Seymour Green - Weston
 Stanley Van Beers - Cartwright
 Dora Bryan - Barmaid
 Ellen Pollock - Miss Fossett
 Philip Ray - Bearded Tramp
 Morris Sweden - Pettigrew
 Michael Ward - Art Salesman
 Arnold Bell - Police Inspector
 Clifford Buckton - Lodging House Keeper
 Marianne Noelle - Girl Student
 Leslie Phillips - Boy Student
 Billie Whitelaw - Waitress
 Tom Clegg - 1st Thug
 Guy Deghy - Stranger
 John Wadham - Thug
 Frank Atkinson - Tate Gallery Attendant
 Johnnie Schofield - Tate Gallery Attendant
 Leonard Sharp - Tate Gallery Attendants

Critical reception
Leonard Maltin called the film an "OK crime drama," rating it two out of four stars, while The Hollywood Reporter found it "fairly diverting."

References

External links

1953 films
1953 crime films
Films about theft
Films directed by Godfrey Grayson
Films set in London
British crime films
British black-and-white films
Films with screenplays by Patrick Kirwan
1950s English-language films
1950s British films